Erick Chipeta (born June 28, 1990) is a Zimbabwean professional footballer who plays as a defender and midfielder for the Zimbabwe national team.

Career

Club
Chipeta started his career in Zimbabwe with Hwange Colliery, where he remained for two years before leaving his homeland for South Africa for the first time. 2014 saw Chipeta join newly promoted Premier Soccer League side Chippa United. He made his debut for Chippa in a 1–1 draw at home to Mamelodi Sundowns on 22 October. In total he made 18 appearances and scored 1 goal in his first season with Chippa. In his second season, he scored 3 goals in 25 appearances. In April 2016, ahead of the 2016–17 season, Chipeta agreed to join Ajax Cape Town.

International
Chipeta made his debut for the Zimbabwe national team on 16 June 2013 in a 2014 FIFA World Cup qualifier versus Guinea. He made two more appearances for his nation in 2013. In January 2014, coach Ian Gorowa, invited him to be a part of the Zimbabwe squad for the 2014 African Nations Championship. He helped the team to a fourth-place finish after being defeated by Nigeria by a goal to nil.

Career statistics

Club
.

International
.

References

External links
 

1990 births
Living people
Zimbabwean footballers
Zimbabwe A' international footballers
2014 African Nations Championship players
Association football midfielders
Association football defenders
Zimbabwe international footballers
Hwange Colliery F.C. players
Chippa United F.C. players
Cape Town Spurs F.C. players
Al-Raed FC players
Zimbabwean expatriate footballers
Expatriate soccer players in South Africa
Zimbabwean expatriate sportspeople in South Africa
Expatriate footballers in Saudi Arabia
Zimbabwean expatriate sportspeople in Saudi Arabia